The coin in the fish's mouth is one of the miracles of Jesus, recounted in the Gospel of .

Biblical account
In Matthew's account, in Capernaum the collectors of the two-drachma temple tax ask Peter whether Jesus does not pay the tax, and Peter replies "Yes". When Peter returns to where they are staying, Jesus speaks of the matter, asking Peter's opinion: "From whom do the kings of the earth collect duty and taxes, from their own children or from others?" Peter answers, "from others", and Jesus replies: "Then the children are exempt. But so that we may not cause offense, go to the lake [the Sea of Galilee] and throw out your line. Take the first fish you catch; open its mouth and you will find a four-drachma coin. Take it and give it to them for my tax and yours."

For the New International Version's word "others", the New King James Version reads "strangers" and the Good News Translation reads "foreigners". Albert Barnes argues that "strangers" does not mean "foreigners", but "those that were not their own sons or members of their family".

Analysis
Heinrich Meyer suggests that Peter's assertion "Yes" makes it "clear that Jesus had hitherto been in the habit of paying the tax".

The story ends without stating that Peter caught the fish as Jesus predicted.

Jesus performed this miracle in order to not offend those who collected the two-drachma temple tax. This is the only miracle that Jesus performed in order to avoid offending people. Jesus typically performed miracles as well as made statements that were offensive to his audience, particularly the Jewish priesthood. Jesus' statement "the children are exempt" is one of many statements where Jesus describes his followers and himself as being part of a spiritual family. Some interpretations of this passage indicate that Christians should not pay the traditional church tithe. Some interpretations of Peter's reply "from others" indicate that the church tithe should not come from Christians, but rather from non-Christian visitors attending church.

The four-drachma (or shekel) coin would be exactly enough to pay the temple tax (two-drachma coin) for two people. It is usually thought to be a Tyrian shekel.

Jesus' reluctance to pay the temple tax is consistent with his teachings regarding the physical temple. The Gospels record five times when he either says "destroy this temple, and in three days I will rebuild it", or is quoted as saying this. Jesus may have said this to emphasize a spiritual temple over the physical temple.

The coin in the fish's mouth is generally seen as a symbolic act or sign, but there is little agreement concerning what it signifies.

The Bible does not specify the species of the fish caught by Peter, but tilapia is sometimes referred to as "St. Peter's fish".

History of the didrachma tribute

This tribute was a civil tax, which was given either to the Romans, or to Herod Antipas. This is evident from the phrase of Christ, "of whom do the kings of the earth take custom, or tribute?" Thus it was payable to a king or an emperor. The same is clear from Matthew 22:21, where the Herodians ask Jesus, "is it lawful to pay tribute to Caesar?” The tribute started to be levied before the time of Christ, when Hyrcanus and Aristobulus, the grandsons of Simon Maccabaeus were fighting over which one should have the high priesthood. Pompey was called in to meditate between them, and decided on Hyrcanus. However the people of Jerusalem favoured the other candidate, and gave it back to Aristobulus. Pompey subsequently overthrew Jerusalem, and made Judea under subjection to Rome, with an annual tribute. And because the Jews were used to paying a didrachma for the temple (Exodus 30:13), the Romans had them pay the same tax to them. However after the rebellion, when Jerusalem was captured by Vespasian, the temple was destroyed, and he ordered them to pay the didrachma to the Roman capitol. But the Jews disliked paying tribute to the Romans. They claimed that as the people of God, they should pay tribute to God, not Rome. This sentiment around the time of Christ, resulted in the sect of the Galilæans, led by Judas of Galilee, who refused to pay tribute to Caesar. Christ and His Apostles were suspected of being members of this sect, since they were from Galilee, and preached a new, heavenly kingdom. St. Jerome, Bede and others are of the opinion that in order therefore that Christ might show the baselessness of this charge, He paid the didrachma. The collectors of the tribute did not try to ask Christ for it, because of the great report of His sanctity and miracles, and instead asked Peter.

See also
 Render unto Caesar
 Life of Jesus in the New Testament
 Miracles of Jesus
 The Tribute Money (Masaccio)

References

Miracles of Jesus
Coins in the Bible
Gospel of Matthew
Saint Peter
Fish in Christianity
Animals in the Bible